Silvanosoma striatum is a species of beetles in the family Silvanidae, the only species in the genus Silvanosoma.

References

Silvanidae genera
Monotypic Cucujoidea genera